Leon Bristedt (born March 14, 1995) is a Swedish professional ice hockey forward. He is currently playing with HC Davos in the National League (NL).

Bristedt spent four years at the University of Minnesota in the Big Ten Conference before returning to Sweden and signing with Rögle BK of the Swedish Hockey League (SHL) in 2018.

References

External links

1995 births
Living people
HC Davos players
Minnesota Golden Gophers men's ice hockey players
Rögle BK players
Ice hockey people from Stockholm
Swedish ice hockey forwards